The 1990 Chicago Cubs season was the 119th season of the Chicago Cubs franchise, the 115th in the National League and the 75th at Wrigley Field. The Cubs finished fourth in the National League East with a record of 77–85.

Offseason
 December 7, 1989: Paul Kilgus was traded by the Cubs to the Toronto Blue Jays for José Núñez.
 January 2, 1990: Vance Law was released by the Cubs.

Regular season
 Ryne Sandberg became the first second baseman to lead the National League in home runs since Rogers Hornsby in 1925.
 Sandberg also set the Major League record for consecutive errorless games at second base with 124.

Season standings

Record vs. opponents

Notable transactions
 September 1, 1990: Greg Kallevig (minors) was traded by the Cubs to the Pittsburgh Pirates for Randy Kramer.

Roster

Game log

All-Star Game

The 1990 Major League Baseball All-Star Game was the 61st playing of the midsummer classic between the all-stars of the American League (AL) and National League (NL), the two leagues comprising Major League Baseball. The game was held on July 10, 1990, at Wrigley Field in Chicago, the home of the Chicago Cubs of the National League. The game resulted in the American League defeating the National League 2-0. The game is remembered for a rain delay in the 7th inning that resulted in CBS airing Rescue 911 during the delay.

Player stats

Batting

Starters by position
Note: Pos = Position; G = Games played; AB = At bats; H = Hits; Avg. = Batting average; HR = Home runs; RBI = Runs batted in

Other batters
Note: G = Games played; AB = At bats; H = Hits; Avg. = Batting average; HR = Home runs; RBI = Runs batted in

Pitching

Starting pitchers
Note" G = Games pitched; IP = Innings pitched; W = Wins; L = Losses; ERA = Earned run average; SO = Strikeouts

Other pitchers
Note: G = Games pitched; IP = Innings pitched; W = Wins; L = Losses; ERA = Earned run average; SO = Strikeouts

Relief pitchers
Note: G = Games pitched; W = Wins; L = Losses; SV = Saves; ERA = Earned run average; SO = Strikeouts

Awards and honors
 Ryne Sandberg, National League Leader, Home Runs (40)
 Ryne Sandberg, National League Leader, Runs (116)
 Ryne Sandberg, National League Leader, Total Bases (344)

All-Star Game
 Ryne Sandberg, second baseman, starter
 Andre Dawson, outfield, starter
 Shawon Dunston, shortstop, reserve

Farm system

References

External links
1990 Chicago Cubs at Baseball Reference
1990 Cubs on a Chicago-centric wiki

Chicago Cubs seasons
Chicago Cubs season
Cub